Miguel Antonio Correa (born 11 October 1983) is an Argentine sprint canoeist who competed since the late 2000s. At the 2008 Summer Olympics in Beijing, he was eliminated in the semifinals of both the K-1 500 m and the K-1 1000 m events.  At the 2012 Summer Olympics, he and teammate Rubén Voisard, finished in 5th in the men's K-2 200 m.

He was granted the Konex Award Merit Diploma in 2010 as one of the five best canoe racers of the last decade in Argentina. He won the silver medal at the 2011 Pan American Games.

References

External links
 
 
 
 

1983 births
Living people
Argentine male canoeists
Olympic canoeists of Argentina
Canoeists at the 2008 Summer Olympics
Canoeists at the 2012 Summer Olympics
Pan American Games silver medalists for Argentina
Pan American Games medalists in canoeing
Canoeists at the 2011 Pan American Games
Medalists at the 2011 Pan American Games
21st-century Argentine people